Westby is a rural community in the central east part of the Riverina.  It is situated by road, about 9 kilometres south east of Pulletop and 18 kilometres north of Little Billabong.

Westby used to be the site of a railway station but the line has been closed since the mid-1950s.

See also
 Westby railway line

References

Towns in the Riverina
Towns in New South Wales